The Scottish Ontario Chambers is a building in Ottawa at the corner of Sparks Street and Elgin Street that was built in 1883.  It was designed by William Hodgson. It is designated as a heritage property under Part IV of the Ontario Heritage Act.

References

External links
historicplaces.ca
pc.gc.ca

Buildings and structures in Ottawa
National Historic Sites in Ontario
Designated heritage properties in Ontario